Swords Against Darkness II is an anthology of fantasy stories, edited by Andrew J. Offutt. It was first published in paperback by Zebra Books in 1977.

Summary
The book collects eight short stories and novelettes by various fantasy authors, with an introductory essay by Offutt.

Contents
"Call It What You Will" (Andrew J. Offutt)
"Sword of Unbelief" (Andre Norton)
"The Changer of Names" (Ramsey Campbell)
"The Dweller in the Temple" (Manly Wade Wellman)
"The Coming of Age in Zamora" (David M. Harris)
"The Scroll of Thoth" (Richard L. Tierney)
"Odds Against the Gods" (Tanith Lee)
"On Skellig Michael" (Dennis More)
"Last Quest" (Andrew J. Offutt)

External links
ISFD entry for Swords Against Darkness II

1977 anthologies
Fantasy anthologies
Zebra Books books